Georgios Kalaitzis (also spelled Giorgos; ; born August 29, 1976) is a Greek basketball coach and former player, who is currently the Team Manager of Panathinaikos. During his playing career, at a height of 1.96 m (6'5") tall, Kalaitzis played at the point guard, shooting guard, and small forward positions.

Professional career
In his pro club career, Kalaitzis played with: the Greek Basket League club Panionios, the Italian LBA club Olimpia Milano, and the Greek Basket League clubs Panathinaikos, Aris, Panellinios, and Kolossos. He ended his playing career with Doukas, of the Greek 3rd Division.

National team career
With Greece's under-19 national team, Kalaitzis won the gold medal at the 1995 FIBA Under-19 World Cup. As a member of the senior men's Greek national team, he played at the 1997 EuroBasket, the 1998 FIBA World Championship, the 1999 EuroBasket, and the 2001 EuroBasket.

Coaching career
Kalaitzis became the head coach in the youth academies of Panathinaikos, in 2016. In January 2020, he joined the senior men's first team of Panathinaikos, working as an assistant coach to Rick Pitino.

Awards and accomplishments

Pro career
 2× EuroLeague Champion: (2000, 2002)
 8× Greek League Champion: (1998, 1999, 2000, 2001, 2003, 2004, 2005, 2006)
 3× Greek Cup Winner: (2003, 2005, 2006)
 3× Greek League All-Star: (2001, 2003, 2004)

Greek junior national team
1995 FIBA Under-19 World Cup:

References

External links
Euroleague.net Profile
FIBA Profile
FIBA Europe Profile
Eurobasket.com Profile
Draftexpress.com Profile
Greek Basket League Profile 
Hellenic Federation Profile 
Italian League Profile 

1976 births
Living people
1998 FIBA World Championship players
Aris B.C. players
Doukas B.C. players
Greek basketball coaches
Greek men's basketball players
Greek Basket League players
Kolossos Rodou B.C. players
Olimpia Milano players
Panathinaikos B.C. non-playing staff
Panathinaikos B.C. players
Panellinios B.C. players
Panionios B.C. players
Basketball players from Volos
Point guards
Shooting guards
Small forwards